Malagarion is a genus of air-breathing land snails, terrestrial pulmonate gastropod mollusks or micromollusks in the subfamily Sheldoniinae  of the family Urocyclidae.

Species
Species within the genus Malagarion include:
 Malagarion andampibei Emberton, 1994
 Malagarion andranomenae Emberton, 1994
 Malagarion antalahae Emberton, 1994
 Malagarion borbonicus (Morelet, 1860)
 Malagarion microstriolatus Emberton, 1994
 Malagarion paenelimax Tillier, 1979
 Malagarion tillieri Emberton & Pearce, 2000

References

 Bank, R. A. (2017). Classification of the Recent terrestrial Gastropoda of the World. Last update: July 16th, 2017

External links
 Tillier, S. (1979). Malagarion paenelimax gen. nov., spec. nov., a new slug-like helicarionid from Madagascar (Pulmonata: Helicarionidae). Veliger. 21: 361-368

Urocyclidae